Roselawn may refer to:

in Northern Ireland
 Roselawn Cemetery

in Canada
 Roselawn National Historic Site of Canada, in Kingston, Ontario

in the United States
(by state)
 Roselawn (Altheimer, Arkansas), listed on the NRHP in Arkansas
 Roselawn (Cartersville, Georgia), listed on the NRHP in Georgia
 Roselawn, Indiana, a (CDP)
 Also as a metonym for American Eagle Flight 4184, a 1994 plane crash near Roselawn, Indiana.
 Roselawn (Danville, Kentucky), listed on the NRHP in Kentucky
Roselawn, Cincinnati, Ohio, a neighborhood
 Roselawn (Allendale, South Carolina), listed on the NRHP in South Carolina
 Rose Lawn, Wisconsin, an unincorporated community